JR, J. R. or Jr. may refer to:

 Jr. or Junior (suffix), a name suffix

Arts and entertainment
 J.R. (album), an album by Jim Bob
 J R, a 1975 novel written by William Gaddis
 "Jr.", a song by Codeine on the album Barely Real
 J. R. Ewing, a television character from Dallas
 JR Chandler, aka Adam Chandler Jr, a television character from All My Children
 Jornal da Record, a Brazilian news program on RecordTV

Businesses and organizations
 Aero California, Mexican airline (IATA code JR, 1960-2008)
 Japan Railways Group or the JR Group, the main operators of the Japanese railway network
 Jember railway station
 John Radcliffe Hospital
 Joy Air, Chinese airline (IATA code JR since 2008)

People

In arts and entertainment
 JR (artist) (born 1983), French artist
 J.R. (musician) (born 1979), American Christian musician and producer
 JR (rapper) (born 1987), South African rapper and entrepreneur 
 J. R. a pen-name of writer John Ruskin
 Jr., stage name of Park Jin-young, South Korean singer
 J.R. Martinez (born 1983), American actor, motivational speaker, and former U.S. Army soldier
 Jim Ross (born 1952), professional wrestling commentator
 JR (born 1995), stage name of Kim Jong-hyeon, South Korean singer and member of NU'EST

In politics
 Junius Richard Jayawardena (1906–1996), President of Sri Lanka from 1978–1989

In sport
 J. R. Bremer (born 1980), American-born naturalized Bosnian basketball player
 J. R. Redmond (born 1977), former NFL player for the New England Patriots
 J. R. Smith (born 1985), former NBA player
 Jeremy Roenick (born 1970), professional ice hockey player

See also

 
 Junior (disambiguation)
 JRJR (disambiguation)